The Lulin Observatory (obs. code: D35) is an astronomical observatory operated by the Institute of Astronomy, National Central University in Taiwan.

It is located at the summit of Mount Lulin in Xinyi Township, Nantou County. In 2007, Comet Lulin (C/2007 N3), was found by this observatory, and became the first comet discovered by a Taiwanese researcher. The minor planet 147918 Chiayi was also discovered here.

The Lulin 1 meter had its first light in September 2002, after 10 years of development.

Telescopes
 LOT Cassegrain telescope (D=1-m, f/8)
 SLT R-C telescope (D=0.40-m, f/8.8) by RC Optical Systems or 76-cm Super Light Telescope (SLT)
 Four TAOS robotic telescopes (D=0.50-m, f/1.9)

Projects
 Taiwanese–American Occultation Survey (TAOS)
 Lulin Emission Line Imaging Survey (LELIS)
Exoearth Discovery & Exploration Network EDEN

Lulin Sky Survey (LUSS) 
The Lulin Sky Survey searched for near-Earth objects from 2006 to 2009. The Lulin Sky Survey Telescope, a  Ritchey–Chrétien telescope with a field of view of 27 arcminutes, was operated remotely from mainland China, with robotic software developed in-house. In addition to searching for new objects, the survey refined the orbits of known minor planets and comets, and performed photometric analysis of a subset of objects. The principal investigator, student Quan-Zhi Ye of Sun Yat-sen University, was awarded the 2007 Shoemaker NEO Grant to develop the project. Ye later identified a comet from images collected in July 2007 by collaborator Chi Sheng Lin; the unusual retrograde comet, formally named C/2007 N3, became known as Comet Lulin. It made its closest approach to Earth in February 2009. Over the course of the survey, 781 new objects were discovered, including Comet Lulin and three fragments of comet 73P/Schwassmann-Wachmann. The LUSS project benefited from its location at a longitude with few other observatories looking for minor planets.

See also 
 List of astronomical observatories

References 

 W.S. Tsay, B. C. Chen, K.H. Chang, et al., 2001, “The NCU Lu-Lin Observatory”, in Proceedings of the IAU Colloquium 183 “Small-Telescope on Global Scales”, eds. W.P. Chen, C. Lemme, B. Paczynski, ASP.

External links
 Official Website
 English page
 Lulin Sky Survey (LUSS)

1999 establishments in Taiwan
Discoverers of comets
Astronomical observatories in Taiwan
National Central University
Buildings and structures in Chiayi County
Buildings and structures in Nantou County